Events during the year 1109 in Italy.

Deaths
Bernard of Carinola

References

Years of the 12th century in Italy
Italy
Italy